Hello Europe is third album by West London Post punk and Indie band The Times released in 1984.<ref name="Discogs.com">[http://www.discogs.com/Times-Hello-Europe/release/1460626 The Times on Discogs.com]</ref>

Track listing
Side ARadiateBlue FireVictory DrumsEverything Turns To Black And WhiteBoys BrigadeSide B
Where The Blue Begins
Public Reaction Killed This Cat
Faith
Things Weve Learnt
Kulturshock

Personnel
 John East (bass, vocals)
 Paul Damien (drums, vocals)
 Edward Ball (vocals, guitar)
 The Rhinoceros Horns (horns)
 Anthony Thistlethwaite (saxophone)
 Barbara Snow (trumpet)

References

The Times (band) albums
1984 albums